<div style="float: right; font-size: smaller; background-color:#ABCDEF; padding: 12px; margin-left: 5em; margin-bottom: 2em; width: 180px" align="center">
70th Golden Reel Awards
February 26, 2023

Feature Dialogue / ADR:
<big>The Banshees of Inisherin</big>

Feature Effects / Foley:
Top Gun: Maverick
</div>

The 70th Golden Reel Awards, presented by the Motion Picture Sound Editors (M.P.S.E.), honored the best in sound editing for film, television, gaming and student productions in 2022. The ceremony was held on February 26, 2023, at the Wilshire Ebell Theatre in Los Angeles. For the first time in three years, the awards ceremony was held live and featured special features to celebrate the sound organization's platinum anniversary.

The nominations were announced on January 9, 2023. The film Everything Everywhere All at Once, the television series The Lord of the Rings: The Rings of Power and Stranger Things, and the video games Call of Duty: Modern Warfare II, God of War Ragnarök and Horizon Forbidden West'' led the nominations with three each.

American producer Jerry Bruckheimer and supervising sound editor Gwendolyn Yates Whittle received the Filmmaker Award and Career Achievement Award, respectively; actor Tom Cruise presented the latter. Actor and comedian Patton Oswalt hosted the ceremony.

Winners and nominees
The winners are listed first and in bold.

Film

Broadcast media

Gaming

Student film

References

External links
 

2022 film awards
2022 television awards
2022 video game awards
2022 in American cinema